Limestone Creek is a  river in Onondaga County in the state of New York. From its source on the north side of Arab Hill south of Delphi Falls, New York, and northwest of DeRuyter Reservoir, the creek flows generally north to its confluence with Chittenango Creek.

Course
Originating at the north side of Arab Hill south of Delphi Falls, New York and northwest of DeRuyter Reservoir the creek begins traveling northward. After a short distance the creek receives the creek that flows through The Gulf, which drains DeRuyter Reservoir. The creek then continues a short distance and receives East Branch Limestone Creek just southeast of Delphi Falls. The upper reaches of the creek drain the valley of Pompeys Hollow, west of Cazenovia Lake. The creek then flows past Manlius and Fayetteville, passing under the Erie Canal near Green Lakes State Park, receiving Butternut Creek from the west below Minoa. Downstream of there, it empties into Chittenango Creek which continues a few miles north to Oneida Lake.

History
The Limestone Creek Aqueduct, completed in 1856, carries the Enlarged Erie Canal across Limestone Creek.

See also
List of rivers of New York
Old Erie Canal State Historic Park

References

External links 
 

Rivers of New York (state)
Rivers of Onondaga County, New York
Manlius, New York